Geo Bilongo is a Congolese guitarist that specializes on the rhythm and solo guitar.

Active in the 80's and 90's, he was a session player in Paris. Before he went solo, he played in Orchestra Kara. In the Late 80's, he created the group Malinga System with Solo Sita, later releasing the album Malinga System. In 1994, he created a project called Soukouss Gentlemen which featured Shimita, Papa Wemba, Sam Mangwana, Fede Lawu, and Geo Bilongo. After a few albums, he disappeared from Congolese music and now retired.

External links 
  Geo Bilongo Topic
  Geo Bilongo's Discography

Democratic Republic of the Congo guitarists
Living people
Year of birth missing (living people)